Wittersheim is a commune in the Bas-Rhin department in Grand Est in north-eastern France. It has a population of 671 (2019) and an area of 7.05 km².

Population

See also
 Communes of the Bas-Rhin department

References

Communes of Bas-Rhin